The Kallarawa massacre was carried out by the LTTE, an organisation which has been banned in 33 countries including the US, Australia, EU, India and Canada due to its terrorist activities.

This massacre occurred at a small fishing village called Kallarawa located on the Eastern seaboard of Sri Lanka. Kallarawa is located 35 kilometres away from Trincomalee town. The village was populated by migrant fishermen at the time of the attack. Kallarawa was known as an area which produces good catches for fishermen.

Incident 

The Kallarawa massacre is an incident on 25 May 1995 during which LTTE cadres massacred 42 Sinhalese men, women and children in Kallarawa. All the remaining civilian survivors fled the village after this incident leading to its depopulation. However survivors from the Sinhalese and Muslim communities have returned to Kallarawa under the protection of the Sri Lankan Army.

Eyewitness accounts

G. Dayananda, an old fishermen from Kallarawa who survived the massacre, recounted the massacre as follows:

Response 
In a letter to Amnesty International, the LTTE seemed to implicitly claim responsibility for the attack, stating that the village was part of the government's war strategy and thus a legitimate target. Amnesty noted that there were no reports of firearms being used by the villagers, and thus concluded the massacre was a violation of international humanitarian law.

References

Further reading 
 Gunaratna, Rohan. (1998). Sri Lanka's Ethnic Crisis and National Security, Colombo: South Asian Network on Conflict Research. 
 Gunaratna, Rohan. (1 October 1987). War and Peace in Sri Lanka: With a Post-Accord Report From Jaffna, Sri Lanka: Institute of Fundamental Studies. 
 Gunasekara, S.L. (4 November 2003). The Wages of Sin, 

Massacres in 1995
Attacks on civilians attributed to the Liberation Tigers of Tamil Eelam
Massacres in Sri Lanka
Liberation Tigers of Tamil Eelam attacks in Eelam War III
Mass murder in 1995
Mass murder of Sinhalese
May 1995 events in Asia
Terrorist incidents in Sri Lanka in 1995